The 2013 CERH European Roller Hockey U-17 Championship was the 32nd edition of the CERH European Roller Hockey Juvenile Championship. It was held in Alcobendas, Spain from 1 to 7 September 2013.

Group stage

Group A

1 September 2013

2 September 2013

3 September 2013

4 September 2013

5 September 2013

Group B

1 September 2013

2 September 2013

3 September 2013

4 September 2013

5 September 2013

Knockout stage

Championship

5th - 8th playoff

9th–10th playoff

Final standing

See also
 Roller Hockey
 CERH European Roller Hockey Juvenile Championship

References

European Roller Hockey Juvenile Championship
2013 in Spanish sport
2013 in roller hockey
International roller hockey competitions hosted by Spain